Bathypluta is a genus of moths belonging to the subfamily Tortricinae of the family Tortricidae.

Species
Bathypluta metoeca Diakonoff, 1950
Bathypluta triphaenella (Snellen, 1903)

See also
List of Tortricidae genera

References

 , 2005: World catalogue of insects volume 5 Tortricidae.
 , 1950, Bull. Br. Mus. (Nat. Hist.), Ent. 1: 215
 , 1993: A new species of Bathypluta Diakonoff from Sulawesi (Tortricidae). Tyô to Ga, 43 (4): 237–238. Abstract and full article: .

External links
tortricidae.com

Ceracini
Tortricidae genera